Doctor Elise: The Royal Lady with the Lamp is a South Korean web novel written by Yuin. It was serialized in Kakao's KakaoPage service from December 2015 to April 2016. A manhwa adaptation illustrated by Mini was serialized in KakaoPage from September 2017 to February 2021. An anime television series adaptation by Maho Film has been announced.

Media

Novel
Written by Yuin, Doctor Elise: The Royal Lady with the Lamp was serialized on Kakao's KakaoPage service from December 30, 2015, to April 27, 2016, and has been published in four volumes. A side story was released from May 4 to 30, 2016. A second side story was serialized from September 19 to November 27, 2017.

Manhwa
A manhwa adaptation illustrated by Mini was serialized in KakaoPage from September 18, 2017, to February 16, 2021, and has been compiled into ten volumes by Pinetoon. The series is published digitally in English by Tappytoon and Lezhin Comics. In Japan, the manhwa has been released digitally on Kakao's Piccoma service, and published in print by Kadokawa Shoten.

Anime
An anime television series adaptation was announced on February 28, 2023. It is produced by Maho Film and directed by Kumiko Habara, with scripts supervised by Deko Akao, and character designs handled by Yūko Watanabe.

References

External links
  at KakaoPage 
  at KakaoPage 
  
 

2017 webtoon debuts
21st-century South Korean novels
Anime based on manhwa
Fantasy webtoons
Fiction about reincarnation
Isekai comics
Kadokawa Shoten manga
Maho Film
Manhwa titles
Medical anime and manga
Medical novels
Romance webtoons
South Korean webtoons
Upcoming anime television series